Janina Wirth (later surname: Weiß, born in 1966) is a former competitive figure skater for East Germany. She is the 1982 World Junior champion. Wirth was coached by Inge Wischnewski and represented SC Dynamo Berlin.

Results

References

Navigation

1966 births
Living people
German female single skaters
World Junior Figure Skating Championships medalists